Aghcheh Rish (also Romanized as Āghcheh Rīsh) is a village in Nazarkahrizi Rural District, Nazarkahrizi District, Hashtrud County, East Azerbaijan Province, Iran. At the 2006 census, its population was 39, in 8 families.

References 

Towns and villages in Hashtrud County